Saint John Transit is the public transit agency serving Saint John, New Brunswick, Canada. Established in 1979 to provide scheduled transit service to the city, it is the largest public transit system in the province in terms of both mileage and passengers.

Services

Fixed routes 
Saint John Transit provides 7 day a week service, with a series of Main Line routes that provide the backbone of the system and feeder routes that connect at 4 major hubs throughout the city. Service begins as early as 5:50am on main routes, and around 6am for secondary and limited routes and ends as late as 11:10pm on some of the main routes and around 10pm on secondary.

FLEX service 
FLEX service does not operate on a fixed route or schedule. Riders must use a smartphone app or call a dispatcher to schedule a ride from a specified FLEX stop. Riders can travel within a zone, or transfer to routes 1, 12 or 15 at common stops. FLEX service is provided Monday to Friday from 6:30am to 6:30pm, and on Saturday from 10am to 6pm. Saint John Transit uses six leased Karzan electric buses for FLEX service. The  buses can carry 20 passengers.

As FLEX service is rolled out, Saint John Transit has discontinued or rerouted fixed routes.

Handi-Bus Service 
Handi-Bus Service service is provided by Independence Plus Inc. for people who cannot use the regular transit system due to disabilities.

History 
Saint John Transit had six predecessors:
 People's Street Railway Company (1869–1876): Horsecar operation
 Saint John City Railway Company (1887–1892): Horsecar operation
 Consolidated Electric Company (1892–1897): Streetcar operation (electrified April 12, 1893) 
 Saint John Railway Company (1897–1917): Streetcar operator
 New Brunswick Power Company (1917–1948): Streetcar and bus operator (buses since 1936; streetcars until August 7, 1948)
 City Transit Limited (1948–1979?): city bus operator
 Saint John Transit Commission (1979–date): current city bus operator

See also

 Public transport in Canada

References

External links 

 Saint John Transit Official web site

Transit agencies in New Brunswick
Transport in Saint John, New Brunswick
Bus transport in New Brunswick